The Rancho Santiago Community College District (RSCCD), one of four community college districts located in Orange County, California, offers associate degrees and adult education certificates through its two colleges: Santa Ana College in Santa Ana and Santiago Canyon College in Orange.

The RSCCD serves central and eastern Orange County, covering 24% of the county's total area (193 square miles) in the cities of Orange and Villa Park, as well as the community of Anaheim Hills and portions of the cities of Garden Grove, Irvine, Santa Ana, and Tustin.

The RSCCD is governed by a Board of Trustees that is composed of seven trustees elected by the registered voters within the district's boundaries and one student member elected by the student body of Santa Ana College and Santiagao Canyon College. Trustees, with the exception of the student member, are elected to four-year terms commencing in December of the year elected. As terms are staggered, elections are held every two years in connection with the general election. The seven locally elected trustees must reside in three specific areas but are elected at-large.

The current trustees and the areas that they were elected from are as follows:

For 2020, Trustee Claudia C. Alvarez is serving as the Board President, Trustee Nelida Mendoza as the Board Vice President, and Trustee Phillip
Yarbrough as the Board Clerk.

References

External links
 Rancho Santiago Community College District
 Rancho Santiago Community College District Board of Trustees
 Santa Ana College
 Santiago Canyon College

California Community Colleges
Education in Santa Ana, California
Schools accredited by the Western Association of Schools and Colleges
Universities and colleges in Orange County, California
1915 establishments in California
Educational institutions established in 1915